Brandisia is a genus of flowering plants in the family Orobanchaceae.

Species
Brandisia annamitica Bonati
Brandisia cauliflora P.C.Tsoong & L.T.Lu
Brandisia chevalieri Bonati
Brandisia discolor Hook.f. & Thomson
Brandisia glabrescens Rehder
Brandisia hancei Hook.f.
Brandisia kwangsiensis H.L.Li
Brandisia racemosa Hemsl.
Brandisia rosea W.W.Sm.
Brandisia scandens Bonati
Brandisia swinglei Merr.

Species brought into synonymy
 Brandisia pubiflora Benth.: synonym of Alternanthera pubiflora (Benth.) Kuntze

References

External links
 http://www.theplantlist.org/browse/A/Paulowniaceae/Brandisia/

Orobanchaceae
Orobanchaceae genera
Taxa named by Joseph Dalton Hooker